Batman Highway is a two-lane rural highway in northern Tasmania. The highway links the East Tamar and West Tamar Highways via the Batman Bridge and provides the only crossing of the Tamar River north of the city of Launceston. The highway also serves traffic from the West Tamar area to the port of Bell Bay.

See also 

 Highways in Australia
 List of highways in Tasmania

References

Highways in Tasmania